The Miss Nicaragua 2011 pageant, was held on February 26, 2011 in Managua, after weeks of events.  At the conclusion of the final night of competition, Adriana Dorn became the new Miss Nicaragua Universe. She represented Nicaragua at Miss Universe 2011 held in Sao Paulo, Brazil, later that year.  The rest of the finalists would enter different pageants.

Placements

Special awards

 Best Regional Costume - Masaya - Marling Torrez
 Miss Silhouette  - Granada - Lauren Lawson
 Most Beautiful Face - Managua - Adriana Dorn
 Miss Photogenic - Blufields - Angela Nicole Brooks
 Miss Congeniality - Tipitapa - María Esther Cortes
 Best Smile - Granada - Lauren Lawson

Official Contestants

Trivia

 Adriana Dorn was among the favorites contestants to take the title during Miss Universe 2011 but failed to place as a semifinalist.
 Lauren Lawson was appointed to represent her nation in Miss World 2012. She was chosen among other contestants to take part in the "Dances of the World" segment.
 Maria Esther Cortes was crowned Miss Mundo Nicaragua 2014 and she earned the right to represent her nation at Miss World 2014 but she was later dethroned for undisclosed reasons. Yumara López took over as the Nicaraguan entry for the aforementioned pageant.

.

Judges

 Fernando Fuentes Fraile - Fashion Designer
 Dr. Ivan Mendieta Herdocia - - President of Centro Dental de Especialidades S.A
 Lorena Roque - Operations Manager of Univision Communications
 Rene Gonzalez Mejia - President of National Culture Institute
 Juan Ramon Luis Garcia -  Professional Hair Stylist
 Maria Auxiliadora Bea Zamora - Representative of UNILEVER Nicaragua S.A
 Leonel Gonzalez Bendaña -  Owner of G&B Boutique
 Rafael Garzon -  Nicaraguan Goldsmith
 Luis Pastor Gonzalez - Nicaraguan Composer & Singer

.

Background Music

Opening Show – Camerata Bach  - "Nicaragua Mia"
Swimsuit Competition - Stromae - Alors on Danse
Evening Gown Competition – Cuando Vuelva A Tu Lado (Instrumental)

.

Special Guests

 Xolo Batucada  - "Nicaragua Mia"

.

References

Miss Nicaragua
2011 in Nicaragua
2011 beauty pageants